Syd Lawrence (26 June 1923 – 5 May 1998) was a British bandleader, who became famous in the UK for his orchestra's Big Band sound, which drew on the 1940s style of music of Glenn Miller and Count Basie amongst others.

Career
Born in Wilmslow, Cheshire, England, in 1923, Lawrence was a talented trumpet player during World War II. He wrote and arranged music. He was based in Cairo during the war years, playing and arranging for the RAF service bands. After he left the armed forces, he played with some of the leading British dance bands of the 1940s, finally being invited to join the BBC Northern Dance Orchestra in 1953. He stayed with this band for sixteen years playing alongside fellow trumpet player Stan Hibbert.

In 1967, Lawrence teamed up with several of his colleagues at the Northern Dance Orchestra to play the music that he was most enthusiastic about, that of Glenn Miller. Early concerts at the Mersey Hotel in Manchester were a success, and larger venues were found to play in as the reputation of his band grew.

Yorkshire Television gave the Syd Lawrence Orchestra a regular spot on the comedy show Sez Les. As the music became more popular, Lawrence and his band started touring around the UK, which they did with great success for many years. In 1969 he signed with Philips Records and the band's first release was on the Contour label, selling at 10/6d. The Orchestra went on to record about fifteen long playing albums, usually at the Strawberry Recording Studios in Manchester along with radio and television appearances on variety shows. He appeared with his band on 3-2-1 and also occasionally was a vocalist.

Lawrence retired from touring in 1994 and died of an aneurysm in 1998. Following his death, the Syd Lawrence Band continued on and still tours. The orchestra was led by Bryan Pendleton, and is currently led by Chris Dean. In 2011 it was voted the Best Big Band in the Land for the 11th consecutive year.

References

External links
Syd Lawrence: The Man who brought back the Big Bands to us
The Fabulous Syd Lawrence Orchestra

1923 births
1998 deaths
People from Chester
People from Wilmslow
British bandleaders
Deaths from aneurysm
20th-century British musicians
Royal Air Force personnel of World War II
Royal Air Force musicians
Military personnel from Chester